People's Platform is an American public affairs series that aired on the CBS Television network from August 17, 1948 to August 11, 1950. Hosted by Quincy Howe, the series features debates on topical subjects.

Episodes and their status
December 16, 1949 - "What Future Course Should The Republican Party Take?" 

Two episodes are known to survive at the Paley Center for Media, these date from January 24, 1949, and December 7, 1948, and are about military budget, and wage increases, respectively.

See also
1948-49 United States network television schedule
1949-50 United States network television schedule

References

External links
 

1948 American television series debuts
1950 American television series endings
Black-and-white American television shows
CBS original programming
English-language television shows